Lille Synagogue is an Ashkenazi Jewish synagogue in Lille, France.

The Jewish presence in Lille began shortly after Alsace returned to German rule in 1871. Built in the Romano-Byzantine style and opened in 1891, it is the oldest synagogue in the department of Nord. It is one of few synagogues to have survived intact from the Nazi occupation of France, as the Nazis used it to store weapons. In 1984, it was classified as a monument historique.

It is owned by the city and operated by the local community. In January 2022, it reopened after three years of restorations, which were intended to bring its appearance back to how it looked when it opened. The initial budget for restorations was €1.5 million. In November 2018, to raise funds for the renovation and to educate the local community, it ran a mojito bar with guided tours.

References

Buildings and structures completed in 1891
Synagogues in France
Ashkenazi synagogues
Buildings and structures in Lille
Monuments historiques of Nord (French department)
19th-century architecture in France